The Albert Soffel House is a historic house at 508 N. 5th Avenue in Maywood, Illinois. The two flat house was built in 1905 for original owner Albert Soffel. It has an American Foursquare design, a utilitarian style popular in the early twentieth century, with Arts and Crafts and Neoclassical ornamentation. The house has a typical Foursquare plan with a rectangular layout, a front porch supported by three columns, and a hip roof with a dormer. Its decorative features include Ionic styling on the porch columns, dentillation and brackets on the porch roof, additional bracketing along its eaves, and multiple stained glass windows.

The house was added to the National Register of Historic Places on May 22, 1992.

References

Houses on the National Register of Historic Places in Cook County, Illinois
American Foursquare architecture in Illinois
Houses completed in 1905
Maywood, Illinois